The arrondissement of Saint-Denis is an arrondissement (district) of France in the Seine-Saint-Denis department, Île-de-France. It has 9 communes.

Composition

The communes of the arrondissement of Saint-Denis, and their INSEE codes, are:

 Aubervilliers (93001)
 La Courneuve (93027)
 Épinay-sur-Seine (93031)
 L'Île-Saint-Denis (93039)
 Pierrefitte-sur-Seine (93059)
 Saint-Denis (93066)
 Saint-Ouen-sur-Seine (93070)
 Stains (93072)
 Villetaneuse (93079)

History

The arrondissement of Saint-Denis was created in February 1993 from part of the arrondissement of Bobigny.

As a result of the reorganisation of the cantons of France which came into effect in 2015, the borders of the cantons are no longer related to the borders of the arrondissements. The cantons of the arrondissement of Saint-Denis were, as of January 2015:

 Aubervilliers-Est
 Aubervilliers-Ouest
 La Courneuve
 Épinay-sur-Seine
 Pierrefitte-sur-Seine
 Saint-Denis-Nord-Est
 Saint-Denis-Nord-Ouest
 Saint-Denis-Sud
 Saint-Ouen
 Stains

References

Saint-Denis

vi:Saint-Denis (quận)